Masaya Ishizuka is a Japanese karateka. He won the gold medal in the men's kumite 84 kg event at the 2017 Asian Karate Championships held in Astana, Kazakhstan.

At the 2016 World Karate Championships held in Linz, Austria, he won the silver medal in the men's team kumite event.

References 

Living people
Year of birth missing (living people)
Place of birth missing (living people)
Japanese male karateka
21st-century Japanese people